Radom Department (Polish: Departament radomski) was a unit of administrative division and local government in Polish Duchy of Warsaw in years 1809–1815.

Its capital city was Radom, and it was further divided onto 10 powiats.

In 1815 it was transformed into Sandomierz Voivodeship.

Departments of the Duchy of Warsaw